Violales is a botanical name of an order of flowering plants and takes its name from the included family Violaceae; it was proposed by Lindley (1853). The name has been used in several systems, although some systems used the name Parietales for similar groupings. In the 1981 version of the influential Cronquist system, order Violales was placed in subclass Dilleniidae with a circumscription consisting of the families listed below. Some classifications such as that of Dahlgren placed the Violales in the superorder Violiflorae (also called Violanae). 

The Angiosperm Phylogeny Group (APG) system does not recognize order Violales; Violaceae is placed in order Malpighiales and the other families are reassigned to various orders as indicated.

 order Violales Perleb 1826
 family Achariaceae → order Malpighiales
 family Ancistrocladaceae → order Caryophyllales
 family Begoniaceae → order Cucurbitales
 family Bixaceae → order Malvales
 family Caricaceae → order Brassicales 
 family Cistaceae → order Malvales
 family Cucurbitaceae → order Cucurbitales
 family Datiscaceae →  order Cucurbitales
 family Dioncophyllaceae →  order Caryophyllales
 family Flacourtiaceae → included in family Salicaceae, in order Malpighiales
 family Fouquieriaceae → order Ericales
 family Frankeniaceae → order Caryophyllales
 family Hoplestigmataceae → uncertain position
 family Huaceae → eurosids I (direct placement)
 family Lacistemataceae →  order Malpighiales
 family Loasaceae →  order Cornales
 family Malesherbiaceae →  order Malpighiales (optionally inside Passifloraceae)
 family Passifloraceae →  order Malpighiales
 family Peridiscaceae →  order Saxifragales
 family Scyphostegiaceae → included in family Salicaceae, in order Malpighiales
 family Stachyuraceae → order Crossosomatales
 family Tamaricaceae → order Caryophyllales
 family Turneraceae →  order Malpighiales (optionally inside Passifloraceae)
 family Violaceae → order Malpighiales

References

Bibliography 

 
 
 
 
 
 

Historically recognized angiosperm orders